The American rock band Paramore has released six studio albums, five extended plays, two live albums, twenty five singles, one video album, and twenty six music videos. The band was formed in Franklin, Tennessee, in 2004 by lead vocalist Hayley Williams with guitarists Josh Farro and Taylor York, bassist Jeremy Davis, and drummer Zac Farro. In 2005, Paramore signed with the New York City-based Fueled by Ramen and released their debut album entitled All We Know Is Falling. Three singles were released from the album, but none of them charted. The album did not chart in the Billboard 200 either, although it peaked at number thirty in the Billboard Top Heatseekers. All We Know Is Falling received gold certification in the United Kingdom and in July 2014 the RIAA certified the album gold in the United States.

The band's breakthrough album came in 2007 with Riot!. After its release in June, the album peaked at number fifteen on the Billboard 200 album chart and received multiple certifications all over the world, including triple platinum in the United States. The lead single, "Misery Business", became their first charting single in the Billboard Hot 100, certified single, and in 2015, the band's first to be certified triple platinum in the United States. Paramore contributed to the Twilight film soundtrack in 2008 recording of two original songs, including the single "Decode". In 2009, the band released their third studio album Brand New Eyes, which debuted and peaked at number two in the United States, was the number one album in several other countries, including Australia and the United Kingdom, and was certified platinum in the United States in March 2016. The album produced five singles, including "Ignorance" and "The Only Exception", who both received certifications in numerous countries. In 2013, the band released their fourth album Paramore, which peaked at number one in many countries and was certified platinum in the United States in March 2016. The singles "Still Into You" and "Ain't It Fun" both became radio hits, while the latter also became the band's first top ten single on Billboard Hot 100 chart.

Albums

Studio albums

Live albums

Box sets

Extended plays

Singles

Other charted songs

Music videos

Notes

References
General
 
 

Specific

External links

Discographies of American artists
Discography
Punk rock group discographies